Anavitrinella addendaria is a species of geometrid moth in the family Geometridae.

The MONA or Hodges number for Anavitrinella addendaria is 6592.

References

Further reading

External links

 

Boarmiini
Articles created by Qbugbot
Moths described in 1908